Homonoeini is a tribe of longhorn beetles of the subfamily Lamiinae. It was described by James Thomson in 1864.

Taxonomy
 Anapausa Thomson, 1864
 Anapausoides Breuning, 1973
 Bumetopia Pascoe, 1858
 Caroliniella Blair, 1940
 Catapausa Aurivillius, 1908
 Filipinmulciber Vives, 2009
 Grynex Pascoe, 1888
 Heteroclytomorpha Blanchard, 1853
 Homonoea Newman, 1842
 Inermomulciber Breuning, 1974
 Metamulciber Breuning, 1940
 Metopivaria McKeown, 1952
 Mulciber Thomson, 1864
 Notomulciber Blackburn, 1894
 Paragrynex Breuning, 1940
 Paramulciber Breuning, 1939
 Pseudomulciber Breuning, 1961
 Sormea Lacordaire, 1872
 Trachelophora Perroud, 1855

References

 
Lamiinae